Gian Paolo Palenteri, O.F.M. Conv. (died 1606) was a Roman Catholic prelate who served as Bishop of Lacedonia (1602–1606).

Biography
Gian Paolo Palenteri was ordained a priest in the Order of Friars Minor Conventual.
On 27 November 1602, he was appointed during the papacy of Pope Clement VIII as Bishop of Lacedonia.
He served as Bishop of Lacedonia until his death in 1606.

References

External links and additional sources
 (for Chronology of Bishops) 
 (for Chronology of Bishops) 

17th-century Italian Roman Catholic bishops
Bishops appointed by Pope Clement VIII
1606 deaths
Conventual Franciscan bishops